Kevin Pay (1 November 1939 – 29 June 2020) was an Australian rules footballer who played with Collingwood in the Victorian Football League (VFL).

Pay kicked all of his 31 career goals, playing as a full-forward, in the 1961 VFL season and the tally was enough to top Collingwood's goal-kicking. In just his third league game, against Footscray at Western Oval, he kicked a career best eight goals. After leaving Collingwood he played briefly with Sandringham.

References

External links
Collingwood Forever profile

1939 births
2020 deaths
Australian rules footballers from Victoria (Australia)
Collingwood Football Club players
Sandringham Football Club players